Andreas Wenzel (born 18 March 1958) is a former World Cup alpine ski racer from Liechtenstein, active from 1976 to 1988. Born in Planken, he was the overall World Cup champion in 1980, the same season in which his older sister Hanni won the women's overall title.  He also won two season titles in the combined event, in 1984 and 1985.

Career
Wenzel competed in four Winter Olympics, and won two Olympic medals and four World Championship medals, including one gold (through 1980, the Olympics doubled as the World Championships). One of the top five-event racers of his era, he finished his World Cup career with 14 victories, 48 podiums, and 122 top ten finishes.

Up to the 2018 Winter Olympics, Liechtenstein has won ten medals in its history of competition in the Winter Olympics, with eight of these medals achieved by two sets of siblings –  Andreas and his sister Hanni are responsible for six medals, while brothers Willi and Paul Frommelt are responsible for two more. His niece Tina Weirather won a bronze medal in Super-G for Liechtenstein at the 2018 Winter Olympics in PyeongChang.

World Cup results

Season standings

Season titles
3 titles – (1 overall, 2 combined)

Individual races
14 wins: 1 super-G, 3 giant slalom, 4 slalom, 6 combined

See also
List of Olympic medalist families

References

External links
 
 

1958 births
Living people
Liechtenstein male alpine skiers
Olympic alpine skiers of Liechtenstein
Olympic silver medalists for Liechtenstein
Olympic bronze medalists for Liechtenstein
Olympic medalists in alpine skiing
Medalists at the 1980 Winter Olympics
Medalists at the 1984 Winter Olympics
Alpine skiers at the 1976 Winter Olympics
Alpine skiers at the 1980 Winter Olympics
Alpine skiers at the 1984 Winter Olympics
Alpine skiers at the 1988 Winter Olympics
FIS Alpine Ski World Cup champions